is a Japanese voice actor who is part of the voice actor quartet Weiß, which also consists of Weiß Kreuz voice castmates Tomokazu Seki, Takehito Koyasu and Shin-ichiro Miki.

In June 2007, Yuki changed the spelling of his name to 優希比呂 from 結城比呂, which still reads as Yūki Hiro.

He's the official Japanese-dubbing voice actor for Stan Marsh in South Park.

Filmography

Anime
Dragon Ball Z (1989-1996) – Dende (took over the role in 1996)
Oishinbo (1991) – Masashi
Future GPX Cyber Formula (1991) – Henri Claytor
Nintama Rantaro (1993) – Rikichi Yamada
The Brave Express Might Gaine (1993) – Yulius
Brave Police J-Decker (1994) – Drillboy
Haou Taikei Ryū Knight (1994) – Adeu Waltham
Tekkaman Blade II (1994) – Dead End/Tekkamen Dead
 Virtua Fighter (1995–1996) – Jimmy Gates
Dragon Ball Z: Wrath of the Dragon (1995; Film) – Tapion
Neon Genesis Evangelion (1995) – Makoto Hyuga
Aka-chan to Boku (1996) – Akihiro Fujii
Bakusō Kyōdai Let's & Go!! (1996) – Carlo Sereni
Slayers NEXT (1996) – Alfred Seyruun
Brave Command Dagwon (1996) – Yoku Kazamatsuri
Dragon Ball GT (1996-1997) – Dende
Mobile Suit Gundam: The 08th MS Team (1996-1999; OVA) – Michel Ninorich
Shōjo Kakumei Utena (1997) – Dios
Pokémon (1997) – Dorio
Arc the Lad (1999) – Arc
Hoshin Engi (1999) – Taikoubou
Shamanic Princess (1996-1998) – Leon
Weiß Kreuz (1998) – Omi Tsukiyono
Star Ocean EX (2001) – Claude C. Kenni
s-CRY-ed (2001) – Sou Kigetsuki
Go! Go! Itsutsugo Land (2001) – Hinoki Morino
RockMan.EXE (2002) – Raika
Witch Hunter Robin (2002) – Michael Lee
Mobile Suit Gundam SEED (2002-2003) – Clotho Buer
Weiß Kreuz Glühen (2002-2003) – Omi Tsukiyono
Samurai Champloo (2004) – Niwa Tatsunoshin
Initial D Fourth Stage (2004) – Shinichi
Suki na Mono wa Suki Dakara Shōganai! (2005) – Chris
Speed Grapher (2005) – Tsujido
Buso Renkin (2006) – Kawazui
Nerima Daikon Brothers (2006) – Yūkel Hakushon
Claymore (2007) – Rigaldo
Yes! PreCure 5 (2007) – Kawarino
Air Gear (2007) – Mitsuru Bando
Hakushaku to Yōsei (2008) – Nico
Kaidan Restaurant (2009) – Sho Koumoto
Metal Fight Beyblade (2009-2012) – Ryuutarou Fukami
Toriko (2012) – Ohtake
Hero Bank (2014) – Agreement Shuto

Video games
Arc the Lad series – Arc
Angelique series – Marcel
Black/Matrix series – Phillipe
Dragon Ball Z: Sparking series – Tapion
Fatal Fury series – Alfred
Makeruna! Makendō 2 (1995) – Masoccer
Neon Genesis Evangelion: Girlfriend of Steel 2nd – Makoto Hyuga
Reijou Tantei Office no Jikenbo – Tatsuya Asami
Samurai Shodown V (2003) – Yoshitora Tokugawa
Samurai Shodown V Special (2004) – Yoshitora Tokugawa
Star Ocean series – Ratix Ferrence
Sukisho series – Chris
Super Robot Wars series – Clotho Buer, Adeu Waltham
Tales of Graces (2009) – Reimon

Drama CDs
Abunai series 3: Abunai Bara to Yuri no Sono
Abunai series 5: Abunai Shiawase Chou Bangaihen – Papa Sudou, Shinobu Suzaku, Aki Shinohara
Junjou Boy Series 1: Junjou Boy Kinryouku – Samiya Kouzuki
Junjou Boy Series 2: Junjou Heart Kaihouku – Samiya Kouzuki
Kageki series 4: Kageki ni Koi Meikyuu – young Touma
Kiken ga Ippai – Yuuki Ogawa
Konna Joushi ni Damasarete 1 & 2 – Kaname Midorikawa
Shiritsu Takizawa Koukou Seitokai – Naoki Sone
Suit and Ribbon Tie – Yoshiyuki Takaoka
Tokyo Deep Night – Makoto Mihara
Tokyo Midnight – Makoto Mihara
Tsukiyo ni Koisuru Touzoku-san – Ruu

Tokusatsu
Doubutsu Sentai Zyuohger (2016) – Saguil Brothers B (A Voiced by Hidenobu Kiuchi) (ep. 37 – 38)

Dubbing

Live-action
Life with Mikey – Barry Corman (David Krumholtz)
She-Wolf of London – Rod (Daniel Pope)

Animation
Shrek films – Gingerbread Man
Shrek Forever After – Cookie
South Park – Stan Marsh (Trey Parker)

References

 Endo, Akira et al. "Voice Actor Spotlight". (November 2006) Newtype USA. pp. 110–111.

External links
 Hiro Yūki at GamePlaza-Haruka Voice Acting Database 
 

1965 births
Living people
Japanese male voice actors
Japanese male video game actors
Male voice actors from Tokyo
20th-century Japanese male actors
21st-century Japanese male actors